Frank Steffel (born 2 March 1966) is a German politician of the Christian Democratic Party (CDU).

Early life and education 
Born in West Berlin, Steffel grew up in Berlin's Frohnau district.

Political career 
Steffel has been a member of the CDU since 1983. He was a member of the State Parliament in Berlin from 1991 to 2009. From 2001 until 2019, he led the CDU in Berlin-Reinickendorf. In the Berlin state elections of 2001 he was the CDU's candidate for the position as Governing Mayor of Berlin. His election campaign was considered unfortunate. For instance he described Munich as Germany's "most beautiful city" and as its "secret capital". Although his party suffered enormous losses at the elections under his leadership, Steffel remained chairman of the CDU group in the State Parliament until 2003. Between 2005 and 2006, he chaired the Sub-Committee on Sports.

Steffel first became a member of the Bundestag in 2009. In parliament, he served on the Committee on Sports. From 2013 until 2017, he was a member of the Finance Committee, where he served as his parliamentary group's rapporteur on money laundering, tax treaties and land transfer taxes. From 2018, he was also a member of the Committee on Foreign Affairs. In that capacity, he was his parliamentary group's rapporteur on Ukraine, Southern Africa, Japan and the Iberian Peninsula.

In 2019, Steffel announced that he would not stand in the 2021 federal elections but instead resign from active politics by the end of the parliamentary term.

Other activities 
 Füchse Berlin, Member of the Advisory Board
 Volker Reitz Foundation, Member of the Board of Trustees
 Spielbank Berlin Gustav Jaenecke GmbH & Co., Member of the Advisory Board
 Bundesverband deutscher Spielbanken, Member of the Advisory Board (2009–2013)

Political positions 
In June 2017, Steffel voted against Germany's introduction of same-sex marriage.

Personal life 
Steffel has been married since 1994. The couple has two children and lives in Berlin's Frohnau district.

References

External links 
 https://www.theguardian.com/world/2001/oct/22/johnhooper
 http://www.bundestag.de/bundestag/abgeordnete18/biografien/S/steffel_frank/258984

1966 births
Living people
People from Reinickendorf
Members of the Bundestag for Berlin
Free University of Berlin alumni
German Protestants
Members of the Abgeordnetenhaus of Berlin
Members of the Bundestag 2017–2021
Members of the Bundestag 2013–2017
Members of the Bundestag 2009–2013
Members of the Bundestag for the Christian Democratic Union of Germany